Cerebellar degeneration-related protein 1 is a protein that in humans is encoded by the CDR1 gene.

See also
 Cerebellar degeneration-related protein 2

References

Further reading

External links